Franz Xavier Dengler (known as Frank Dengler; 1853 Cincinnati, Ohio – 1879) was an American sculptor.

Biography
He went abroad while young, studied in the Munich Academy of Fine Arts, and received there in 1874 a silver medal for his group the "Sleeping Beauty." He was for a short time an instructor in modeling in the School of the Museum of Fine Arts, Boston, but resigned in 1877 on account of failing health, and moved to Covington, Kentucky, and afterward to Cincinnati. Among his works are "Azzo and Melda" (1877), an ideal head of "America," and several portrait busts.

Notes

Attribution

References
 

1853 births
1879 deaths
19th-century American sculptors
19th-century American male artists
American male sculptors
Academy of Fine Arts, Munich alumni
School of the Museum of Fine Arts at Tufts faculty